Mathew  is a masculine given name and a variant of Matthew. It is also used as a surname.

As a given name

Notable people with the given name include:

 Mat Erpelding (born 1975), American politician
 Mat Kearney (born 1978), American singer-songwriter
 Mat Latos (born 1987), American Major League Baseball pitcher
 Mat Mendenhall (born 1957), American former National Football League player
Mathew Knowles (born 1952), record executive, band manager and father of Beyoncé and Solange
 Mat Osman (born 1967), English musician, bassist of the rock band Suede
 Mathew Leckie (born 1991), Australian footballer
 Mathew Martoma (born 1974), American hedge fund portfolio manager, convicted of insider trading
 Mathew Pitsch (born c. 1963),  American businessman and politician
 Mathew Ryan (born 1992), Australian footballer
 Mathew Thompson (born 1982), Australian sports commentator and television presenter
 Mathew Barzal (born 1997), Canadian professional ice hockey centre
 Matt Willis (born 1983), English musician

As a surname

Notable people with the surname include:

 Annamma Mathew (1922–2003), chief editor of largest selling women's magazine in India, wife of K.M. Mathew
 Arnold Mathew (1852–1919), first Old Catholic bishop in the United Kingdom
 Bibin Mathew (born 1987), Indian track and field sprinter
 Biju Mathew, Indian-American activist
 Brian Mathew (born 1936), British botanist
 C. N. Saliya Mathew, 2nd Governor of Sabaragamuwa Province, Sri Lanka
 C. V. Mathew, Indian bishop
 Cyril Mathew (c.1912–1989), Sri Lankan politician and writer
 David Mathew (disambiguation)
 Edley Winston Mathew (1907-1978), Sri Lankan politician, Member of Parliament for Balangoda Electoral District
 Edward Mathew (British general) (1729–1805), fought in the American Revolutionary War
 Francis James Mathew, 2nd Earl Landaff (1768–1833), Irish politician
 Gervase Frederick Mathew (1842–1928), English naval officer and entomologist
 Harriet Mathew, 18th century London socialite and patron of the arts
 Hywel ap Syr Mathew (died 1581), Welsh poet, genealogist and soldier
 John Mathew (1849–1929), Australian Presbyterian minister and anthropologist
 K. K. Mathew 1911–1992), Indian Supreme Court judge
 K. M. Mathew (1917–2010), chief editor of leading Malayalam newspaper in Kerala, India
 KM Mathew, pen-name Ekalavyan, (1934–2012), Indian writer
 Karthika Mathew, Indian actress
 Kuzhivelil Mathew (born 1931), Indian biblical scholar
 Lazar Mathew, Indian medical academic
 Montague James Mathew (1773–1819), Irish politician and British Army general
 Nikhil Mathew (born 1984), singer from Kerala, India
 Oommen Mathew (born 1939), Indian politician
 Ray Mathew (1929–2002), Australian author
 Rebekka Mathew (born 1986), Danish pop singer
 Robert Mathew (1911–1966), British Barrister and politician
 Sarah Mathew (c. 1805–1890), New Zealand diarist
 Simon Mathew (born 1984), Danish pop singer
 Suleka Mathew, Canadian actress
 Sushanth Mathew (born 1981), Indian football player
 Theobald Mathew (disambiguation)
 M. Thomas Mathew (born 1940), Indian literary critic
 Trevin Mathew (born 1978), Sri Lankan cricketer

See also
 Matthew (name), more common spelling of 
 Matthew (surname)
 Matthews (disambiguation)